"When I Was Young" is a song released in early 1967 by Eric Burdon and The Animals; it was written by five of the band members – Eric Burdon (vocals), Barry Jenkins (drums), John Weider (guitar/violin), Vic Briggs (guitar), and Danny McCulloch (bass) – and was the first release to feature this lineup. It charted in Australia, peaking at No. 2 and staying 4 weeks there. Later, it hit No. 10 on the Canadian RPM chart, No. 15 in the United States, and No. 9 in the Netherlands.  The song has been covered by many punk rock and heavy metal bands.

Background
This somewhat autobiographical song tells about Burdon's father, who was a soldier during tough times, as well as young Eric's adventures - including his first cigarette at 10, to his meeting his first love at 13.  The final verse shows his disillusionment with society:

This song is noted for its Indian riff, played by an electric guitar and a violin.  It is also distinctive for its introduction, which featured a heavily distorted guitar's whammy bar descent from E to D.  This song begins in E Minor, and ends in G Minor. The B-Side "A Girl Named Sandoz" is named after the drug company that invented LSD.

In time, it was utilized in a German TV commercial.  In the early 1980s Burdon began to mention, at the end of the song, many stars who had died.

Reception
Billboard described the single as containing "blockbuster biting material" and an "intriguing dance arrangement."  Cash Box called the single a "strong, gutsy, reflective Blues effort with a particularly interesting instrumental backing."

Charts

References

1967 singles
The Animals songs
Songs written by Eric Burdon
Song recordings produced by Tom Wilson (record producer)
MGM Records singles
British hard rock songs
1967 songs